Bruno Moritz (born January 10, 1898, date of death unknown) was a German–Ecuadorian chess master.

He shared 1st at Bad Oeynhausen 1922 (Hauptturnier B), took 10th at Frankfurt 1923 (the 23rd DSB Congress, Ernst Grünfeld won), took 12th at Breslau 1925 (the 24th DSB-Congress, Efim Bogoljubow won), took 12th at Vienna 1926 (DSV-Kongress won by Karl Gilg and Heinrich Wagner), won at Stargard 1926, shared 2nd, behind Fritz Sämisch, at Stettin 1930, took 13th at Swinemünde 1931 (the 27th DSB-Congress, Bogoljubow and Ludwig Rödl won), and tied for 6-7th at Swinemünde 1932 (Gösta Stoltz won).   

In the 1930s, he emigrated from Germany because of Nazi policy.

Moritz played for Germany in 2nd unofficial Chess Olympiad at Budapest 1926, and for Ecuador in the 16th Chess Olympiad at Tel Aviv 1964.

References

1898 births
Jewish emigrants from Nazi Germany
German chess players
German emigrants to Ecuador
Ecuadorian chess players
Jewish chess players
Year of death missing